Carla Rotolo (March 5, 1941 – August 25, 2014)  was an American artist, folk singer and folk music researcher.

Early life

Rotolo was the first child of Joachim Rotolo and Mary (Pezzati) Rotolo, who were union activists. Mary was a writer and editor for several union newspapers, and Joachim painted worker murals.

Like her mother, Rotolo was a political activist but also followed in her artist father's footsteps. As an artist, she painted, drew and sculpted. She also worked as a set decorator for many off-Broadway plays and shows in New York. Her younger sister Suze often joined her.

Greenwich Village years

In the early 1960s Rotolo was an assistant to the eminent folklorist and musicologist Alan Lomax. She accompanied him on his excursions down South to record remote folk singers. Rotolo helped with the 1960 release of 12 folk albums for the Prestige International Records label.

She was involved with the Greenwich Village folk scene, and was friends with Dave Van Ronk, dated the folk singer Paul Clayton and knew many of the most prominent people in Greenwich Village. Rotolo appears in the Alan Lomax documentary Ballads, Blues and Blue Grass which was released in 2012.

Relationship with Bob Dylan 
In 1961, Rotolo became aware of Bob Dylan. According to author Robert Shelton, Rotolo "came up with an idea to help record Dylan and some other unknowns... because of the urgings of...Carla in particular, and my interest in reviewing, Mike Porco booked Bob into Folk City for two weeks." Rotolo occasionally sang three-part harmony with Van Ronk and Dylan. She later introduced her seventeen-year-old sister Suze to Dylan, which led to a three-year relationship.

Dylan would go on to feature Carla Rotolo in his 1964 song "Ballad in Plain D", labeling her as the "parasite sister", after Suze and Dylan broke up in Rotolo's apartment. When interviewed by Howard Sounes for his 2001 Dylan biography, Down the Highway The Life Of Bob Dylan, Rotolo stated: "I remember it being a terrible experience". Informing Sounes that when she heard the song, she had no doubt that she was meant to be the "parasite".

She stated that on the night in question she had asked Dylan to leave, but he refused to go. And that Dylan pushed her, so she pushed him back and that a physical fight almost ensued, adding that friends had to be called and Dylan forcibly removed.

Later life

In the 70s she worked for the controversial Grove Press run by Barney Rosset, and later worked for former baseball player Joe Garagiola, as his personal assistant during his years at NBC. Afterwards she worked as a proofreader and copy editor at various publications.

In 1986, Rotolo was credited with compiling the recordings for a 134-track Bob Dylan bootleg collection called Zimmerman: Ten of Swords. It is considered the "most famous Bob Dylan bootleg of all time". In a shot at Bob Dylan's "Ballad in Plain D", printed on the back of the multi-record set is, "This album was compiled by: Carla Rotolo, chairperson of the board, P.S.A.* 
(* Parasite Sisters Anonymous)."

Right after the Dylan bootleg release, Rotolo moved to Sardinia, Italy, to look after her aged mother and step-father. She made two extensive trips back to the States in 1998 and 2005 visiting friends and relatives.

In July and August 2014 Carla Rotolo was portrayed by actress Jaime Babbitt in the Larry Mollin play Search: Paul Clayton – A True Tale of Love, Folk Music and Betrayal at the Martha's Vineyard Playhouse in Vineyard Haven, Massachusetts.

Rotolo continued to be politically active while living abroad and took part in several conservationist rallies and other efforts to bring awareness to the plight of animals and the natural environment. She staunchly supported of the World Wildlife Fund and Doctors Without Borders as well as many other causes.

Rotolo died from a bad fall in the kitchen of her condo in Santa Teresa di Gallura and was buried September 3, 2014, at the Buoncammino Cemetery outside of town.

Notes

References

External links
 Yankee Jazz Beat article on Carla Rotolo
The Funeral of Carla Rotolo

1941 births
2014 deaths
American people of Italian descent
Artists from New York City
People from Queens, New York
People from Greenwich Village